Over 10 Years is a special album (unofficially the seventh Korean album) by South Korean rock band, FT Island, released on June 7, 2017, by FNC Entertainment. The album was preceded by a remake of the band's debut song, "Love Sick," while title track, "Wind," released alongside the album.

Background
FT Island debuted on June 7, 2007, with the album, Cheerful Sensibility, and its lead title, "Love Sick." Since then the band has grown in fame, being referred to as "Korea's first ever K-pop idol band."

On May 21, 2017, FNC Entertainment announced that FT Island would be releasing an album to commemorate their tenth anniversary on June 7, coinciding with their original debut date. On May 23, the band opened up a website to share their tenth anniversary promotions, as well as the news of a remake of "Love Sick," scheduled for release on May 28. On the day "Love Sick" released, FT Island revealed the album and its title, showing a comeback schedule on Twitter.

Reception
Over 10 Years received positive reception, with a peak of #2 on the GAON chart, #34 on Oricon, and a total of over 30,000 copies of the album sold between Japan and Korea. In a review by Billboard, they stated "The tracks on the anniversary album flit through the group’s sonic history, featuring everything from rock ballads like “Imagine You” and “The Wood” to the more upbeat pop rock vibe of the likes of “No Better Days” and “What U Want,” each of which would likely be single-material on a less sentimental album." Billboard praised such as "Parade" and "Voice" for keeping in tune with their modern style while tracks like "Wind" were made in the style of songs around the time of their debut.

Track listing

References

2017 albums
FNC Entertainment albums